This is a list of now defunct airlines from the Marshall Islands.

See also 
 List of airlines of the Marshall Islands
 List of airports in the Marshall Islands

References 

Airlines
Marshall Islands